Khamseua Bounheuang (born 12 September 1953) is a Laotian sports shooter. He competed in the mixed 50 metre rifle prone event at the 1980 Summer Olympics.

References

1953 births
Living people
Laotian male sport shooters
Olympic shooters of Laos
Shooters at the 1980 Summer Olympics
Place of birth missing (living people)